Marc de Garidel is a French businessman. He is the non-executive chairman of the pharmaceutical company Ipsen and advises Mayroy, the Ipsen controlling holding company.

Education
Marc de Garidel graduated from the École Spéciale des Travaux Publics, an engineering grandes écoles in Paris. He received a business degree from the Thunderbird School of Global Management in Glendale, Arizona, US.

Career
In 1983, he started his career at Eli Lilly and Company, where he worked in France, the United States and Germany.

In 1995, he joined Amgen as vice president of finance and treasury for Europe. In 1998, he became vice president, corporate controller and chief accounting officer of Amgen. In 2000, he became vice president and general manager for France, in charge of Amgen France. In 2006, he became vice president for Southwestern Europe, including France, Spain, Belgium and Portugal. From 2007 to 2010, he served as vice president for Southern Europe, the Middle East, Asia and Latin America at Amgen.

He has was chairman and chief executive officer of Ipsen from November 2010 to July 2016. 

He was also president and spokesperson for G5 santé, a lobbying group for French pharmaceutical companies, including BioMérieux, Guerbet, Ipsen, the Laboratoire français du Fractionnement et des Biotechnologies, Laboratoires Pierre Fabre, Sanofi, Stallergenes and Laboratoires Théa.

Effective July 2016, de Garidel has assumed the role of Ipsen non-executive chairman and has continued to sit on the board of directors. In addition, de Garidel will advise Mayroy, the Ipsen controlling holding company. Previously, he was a director of several biotechnology companies, including vice-chairman of Vifor Pharma (Switzerland) between May 2017 and 2018 (formerly Galenica), of which he was member of the board since 2015. 

In early 2018, de Garidel joined Corvidia Therapeutics, a biotech company based in Waltham, Massachusetts. In April 2018, he raised a 60M series B round led by Venrock & other top tier US & Europe venture capital funds. In June 2020, after its lead asset, Ziltivekimab, was near completion of its phase 2b program, the company was acquired for $2.1B including an upfront of $725M by Novo Nordisk in one of the largest transaction of the biotech sector in the midst of the COVID-19 epidemic.

De Garidel is a director of Claris Biotherapeutics since July 2020. He joined AZTherapies as chief executive officer and board member in October 2020. 

He is a knight in the National Order of the Legion of Honour.

Bibliography
La Société du Médicament (2006)

References

Living people
Year of birth missing (living people)
French businesspeople
Eli Lilly and Company people
Amgen
Chevaliers of the Légion d'honneur